Franklin County Airport  is two miles northwest of Mount Vernon, in Franklin County, Texas, USA.

Facilities
In the year ending December 17, 2003 the airport had 5,700 aircraft operations, all general aviation.

References

External links 

Airports in Texas
Transportation in Franklin County, Texas
Buildings and structures in Franklin County, Texas